The Sun Dance is a ceremony practiced by some Native Americans in the United States  and Indigenous peoples in Canada, primarily those of the Plains cultures. It usually involves the community gathering together to pray for healing. Individuals make personal sacrifices on behalf of the community.

After European colonization of the Americas, and with the formation of the Canadian and United States governments, both countries passed laws intended to suppress Indigenous cultures and force assimilation to majority-European culture.

The Sun Dance was one of the prohibited ceremonies, as was the potlatch of the Pacific Northwest peoples. Canada lifted its prohibition against the practice of the full ceremony in 1951. In the United States, Congress passed the American Indian Religious Freedom Act (AIRFA) in 1978, which was enacted to protect basic civil liberties, and to protect and preserve the traditional religious rights and cultural practices of Native Americans, Eskimos, Aleuts, and Native Hawaiians.

Description

Several features are common to the ceremonies held by Sun Dance cultures. These include dances and songs passed down through many generations, the use of a traditional drum, a sacred fire, praying with a ceremonial pipe, fasting from food and water before participating in the dance, and, in some cases, the ceremonial piercing of skin and a trial of physical endurance. Certain plants are picked and prepared for use during the ceremony.

Typically, the Sun Dance is a grueling ordeal for the dancers, a physical and spiritual test that they offer in sacrifice for their people. According to the Oklahoma Historical Society, young men dance around a pole to which they are fastened by "rawhide thongs pegged through the skin of their chests." 
While not all Sun Dance ceremonies include piercing, the object of the Sun Dance is to offer personal sacrifice for the benefit of one's family and community. The dancers fast for many days, in the open air and whatever weather occurs.

At most ceremonies, family members and friends stay in the surrounding camp and pray in support of the dancers. Much time and energy by the entire community are needed to conduct the sun dance gatherings and ceremonies.  Communities plan and organize for at least a year to prepare for the ceremony. Usually, one leader or a small group of leaders are in charge of the ceremony, but many elders help out and advise. A group of helpers do many of the tasks required to prepare for the ceremony.

Canada: Obstruction, prohibition and resistance
The Government of Canada, through the Department of Indian Affairs (now Crown-Indigenous Relations and Northern Development Canada), persecuted Sun Dance practitioners and attempted to suppress the dance. Indian agents, based on directives from their superiors, did routinely interfere with, discouraged, and disallowed sun dances on many Canadian plains communities from 1882 until the 1940s. 

The Canadian government outlawed "any celebration or dance of which the wounding or mutilation of the dead or living body of any human being or animal forms a part or is a feature" in an 1895 amendment to the Indian Act. Anyone who engaged, assisted or encouraged (either directly or indirectly) was liable to imprisonment. Though not all nations' Sun Dances include the body piercings, the amendment legally prohibited its performance for those communities that did.

It is unclear how often this law was actually enforced; in at least one instance, police are known to have given their permission for the ceremony to be conducted. The First Nations people simply conducted many ceremonies quietly and in secret. Sun dance practitioners, such as the Plains Cree, Saulteaux, and Blackfoot, continued to hold sun dances throughout the persecution period. Some practiced the dance in secret, others with permissions from their agents, and others without the body piercing. 

In 1951, government officials amended the Indian Act, dropping the prohibition against practices of flesh-wounding.

Contemporary practices
The Sun Dance is practiced annually in many First Nations communities in Canada. The Cree and Saulteaux have conducted at least one Rain Dance (with similar elements) each year since 1880 somewhere on the Canadian Plains.

In 1993, responding to what they believed was a frequent desecration of the Sun Dance and other Lakota sacred ceremonies, US and Canadian Lakota, Dakota and Nakota nations held "the Lakota Summit V". It was an international gathering of about 500 representatives from 40 different peoples and bands of the Lakota. They unanimously passed the following 'Declaration of War Against Exploiters of Lakota Spirituality':
"Whereas sacrilegious "sundances" for non-Indians are being conducted by charlatans and cult leaders who promote abominable and obscene imitations of our sacred Lakota sundance rites; ... We hereby and henceforth declare war against all persons who persist in exploiting, abusing, and misrepresenting the sacred traditions and spiritual practices of the Lakota, Dakota and Nakota people." - Mesteth, Wilmer, et al (1993)Taliman, Valerie (1993) "The 'Lakota Declaration of War' ", News From Indian Country, Indian Country Communications, Inc.

In 1995, efforts to continue practicing the ceremony on a tract of unceded Secwepemc land led to an armed confrontation known as the Gustafsen Lake standoff.

In 2003, the 19th-Generation Keeper of the Sacred White Buffalo Calf Pipe of the Lakota asked non-Indigenous people to stop attending the Sun Dance (Wi-wayang-wa-c'i-pi in Lakota); he stated that all can pray in support, but that only Indigenous people should approach the altars. This statement was supported by keepers of sacred bundles and traditional spiritual leaders from the Cheyenne, Dakota, Lakota, and Nakota nations, who issued a proclamation that non-Indigenous people would be banned from sacred altars and the Seven Sacred Rites, including and especially the sun dance, effective March 9, 2003 onward:

Filming

In most Sun Dance cultures, it is forbidden to film ceremony or prayer. Few images exist of authentic ceremonies. Many First Nations people believe that when money or cameras enter, the spirits leave, so no photo conveys an authentic ceremony. The Kainai Nation in Alberta permitted filming of their Sun Dance in the late 1950s. This was released as the documentary Circle of the Sun (1960), produced by the National Film Board of Canada. Manitoba archival photos show that the ceremonies have been consistently practiced since at least the early 1900s.

See also

 Great Race (Native American legend)

References

Group dances
Ritual dances
Native American religion
First Nations culture
Indigenous peoples of the Great Plains
Religion in Canada
Native American dances